Oxobacter pfennigii, previously known as Clostridium pfennigii, is a bacterium belonging to the Bacillota.

References

External links
Type strain of Oxobacter pfennigii at BacDive -  the Bacterial Diversity Metadatabase

Clostridiaceae
Bacteria described in 1985